Mehrshad Sharif (born 11 July 1952) is an Iranian and French chess International Master (IM) (1975), six-times Iranian Chess Championship winner (1974, 1975, 1976, 1977, 1980, 1981).

Biography
From the mid-1970s to the begin 1980s Mehrshad Sharif was one of the leading Iranian chess players. He six times won Iranian Chess Championship: 1974, 1975, 1976, 1977, 1980, and 1981.

In the first half of the 1980s Mehrshad Sharif moved to France. In France, he shared 1st-2nd in the French Chess Championship in 1985 (beaten in the tie by Jean-Luc Seret) and 2nd in 1995 (victory of Éric Prié).

Mehrshad Sharif played for Iran and France in the Chess Olympiads:
 In 1970, at second reserve board in the 19th Chess Olympiad in Siegen (+0, =2, -3),
 In 1972, at fourth board in the 20th Chess Olympiad in Skopje (+8, =6, -7),
 In 1974, at second board in the 21st Chess Olympiad in Nice (+12, =4, -3),
 In 1976, at first board in the 22nd Chess Olympiad in Haifa (+4, =5, -4),
 In 1986, at second reserve board in the 27th Chess Olympiad in Dubai (+2, =2, -0),

Mehrshad Sharif played for France in the World Team Chess Championship:
 In 1985, at fourth board in the 1st World Team Chess Championship in Lucerne (+0, =2, -2).

Mehrshad Sharif played for Iran in the World Student Team Chess Championships:
 In 1972, at third board in the 19th World Student Team Chess Championship in Graz (+5, =5, -3),
 In 1976, at first board in the 21st World Student Team Chess Championship in Caracas (+6, =2, -2).

Mehrshad Sharif played for France in the Men's Chess Mitropa Cup:
 In 1985, at first board in the 10th Chess Mitropa Cup in Aranđelovac (+1, =4, -1),
 In 1988, at first board in the 12th Chess Mitropa Cup in Aosta (+1, =4, -1).

In 1975, Mehrshad Sharif was awarded the FIDE International Master (IM) title.

References

External links

Mehrshad Sharif chess games at 365chess.com

1952 births
Living people
Chess International Masters
Iranian chess players
French chess players
Chess Olympiad competitors
20th-century chess players